The Apsidoceratidae is a family of Middle and Upper Ordovician Barrandeocerina, (a suborder of tarphycerids), characterized by curved or coiled, smooth, transversely marked, or laterally costate shells, with a conspicuous hyponomic sinus. Early whorl sections tend to be subtriangular; become broader and dorsally impressed in closely coiled forms. Sutures are with lateral lobes in primitive forms but are without lateral lobes, but with ventral lobes in more advanced species with broader sections. Siphuncles are between the center and ventral margin, but not close to either.

Genera remaining in the Apsidoceratidae include: 
Apsidoceras
Charactoceras
Charactocerina
Deckeroceras
Fremontoceras
Wilsonoceras

Chidleyenoceras, previously assigned, tentatively, to the Apsidoceratidae has been reassigned (Flower, 1984) to the Plectoceratidae.

References

 Rousseau H. Flower, 1984. Bodeiceras; a New Mohawkian Oxycone, with Revision of the Older Barrandeocerida and Discussion of the Status of the Order. Journal of Paleontology v. 58, no.6, pp 1372–1379, Nov. 1984.
 Walter C Sweet, 1964. Nautiloidea-Barrandeocerida; Treatise on Invertebrate Paleontology Part K Mollusca 3. Geological Society of America and University of Kansas Press.

Ordovician molluscs
Prehistoric nautiloid families
Middle Ordovician first appearances
Late Ordovician extinctions